In Etruscan religion, Hercle (also Heracle or Hercl), the son of Tinia and Uni, was a version of the Greek Heracles, depicted as a muscular figure often carrying a club and wearing a lionskin. He is a popular subject in Etruscan art, particularly bronze mirrors, which show him engaged in adventures not known from the Greek myths of Heracles or the Roman and later classical myths of Hercules.

In the Etruscan tradition, Uni (Roman Juno) grants Hercle access to a life among the immortals by offering her breast milk to him. Hercle was the first man elevated to a godhood through his deeds and Etruscan aristocrats tried to identify with this ascension, as reflected in artwork and literature.

Hercle differed in many aspects from the Greek Heracles. He seems to have enjoyed a special status in Italy in general. In art, he is shown to be a defender of an unknown goddess against creatures on the other side of a human border, showing his status as a Liminal deity. In Etruria, he was also associated with running water. He was also the master of animals, the protector of flocks and herds, and of herdsmen.

Worship

Hercle was more of an oracular god in Etruria than in Greece. Several inscriptions have come to light from 1970 that show evidence of cult worship. Particularly, a sanctuary at Caere preserved many inscriptions of dedications to the god. In Toledo, a bronze weight and an attic red-figured cup created by Euphronios testify an important cult to Hercle.

Scenes from Etruscan art
Hercle can be recognized in Etruscan art from his attributes, or is sometimes identified by name. Since Etruscan literature has not survived, the meaning of the scenes in which he appears can only be interpreted by comparison to Greek and Roman myths, through information about Etruscan myths preserved by Greek and Latin literature, or through conjectural reconstructions based on other Etruscan representations.

See also
 List of Etruscan mythological figures 
Etruscan Religion 
Uni
Tinia

References

Etruscan gods
Etruscan religion
Etruscan mythology
Heracles